Tryssophyton is a genus of flowering plants belonging to the family Melastomataceae.

Its native range is Guyana.

Species:
 Tryssophyton merumense Wurdack 
 Tryssophyton quadrifolius K.Wurdack & Michelang.

References

Melastomataceae
Melastomataceae genera